Juan López Moctezuma (1929 – August 2, 1995) was a Mexican film director and actor. He was born in Mexico City in 1929. During his career he directed five films, all in the genres of supernatural horror and suspense: The Mansion of Madness (1973), Mary, Mary, Bloody Mary (1975), To Kill a Stranger (1984), El Alimento del Miedo (1994), and his most recognized and controversial work, Alucarda (1977), which tells the story of a satanic possession in a Catholic convent.

In 1993 he was admitted to a psychiatric hospital in Mexico City because of Alzheimer's disease. He died on August 2, 1995.

Filmography
The Mansion of Madness (La Mansión de la Locura) (1973)
Mary, Mary, Bloody Mary (1975)
Alucarda (Alucarda, la Hija de las Tinieblas) (1977)
To Kill a Stranger (Matar a un Extraño) (1984)
El Alimento del Miedo (1994)

References

Further reading
 Reyes Nevares, Beatriz (1976). The Mexican Cinema: Interviews With Thirteen Directors. Albuquerque, NM: University of New Mexico Press. pp.97–114. .

External links
 

1929 births
1995 deaths
Mexican film directors